George Boyne  has been Principal and Vice-Chancellor of the University of Aberdeen since 1 August 2018. He was previously Pro-Vice Chancellor and Dean of the Business School at Cardiff University in Wales.

Early life

Originally from Aberdeen, Boyne attended King Street Primary School and Aberdeen Grammar School, and is a double graduate of the University of Aberdeen where he took a politics and economics degree.

Career

He led the creation of the University’s Aberdeen 2040 strategy which was launched in February 2020 to mark the 525th anniversary of the University’s foundation. Aberdeen 2040, which builds directly on the university’s foundational purpose to be open to all and dedicated to the pursuit of truth in the service of others, won the Higher Education Strategic Planners Association award for University strategy of the year in 2021.

Boyne is Chair of the University Senate, a member of the University Court and a member of the Board of the University’s Development Trust.  His external roles include Chair of the Universities and Colleges Employers Association (UCEA), member of the Board of UCEA UK, member of the Board of Opportunity North East, and member of the Aberdeen City Deal Joint Committee.

Boyne is a world-leading expert on the performance of public sector organisations, and has been a Fellow of the Academy of Social Sciences since 2010. He has published eight books and over 140 articles in academic journals.

References 

Year of birth missing (living people)
Living people
Academics of Cardiff Business School
Alumni of the University of Aberdeen
Academics of the University of Aberdeen
Principals of the University of Aberdeen